1963 in philosophy

Events 
 Martin Buber was awarded the Erasmus Prize in 1963.

Publications 
 Hannah Arendt, Eichmann in Jerusalem (1963) and On Revolution (1963)
 Donald Davidson, Actions, Reasons, and Causes (1963)
 William Hardy McNeill, The Rise of the West: A History of the Human Community (1963)
 Betty Friedan, The Feminine Mystique (1963)
 Edmund Gettier, Is Justified True Belief Knowledge? (1963)

Deaths 
 June 17 - John Cowper Powys (born 1872)
 August 27 - W. E. B. Du Bois (born 1868)
 November 22 - Aldous Huxley (born 1894)
 November 22 - C. S. Lewis (born 1898)

References 

Philosophy
20th-century philosophy
Philosophy by year